Philippe Leroy-Beaulieu (born 15 October 1930) is a French actor. He has appeared in over 150 films since 1960, and has worked extensively in Italian cinema, as well as in his native country. He was nominated for the BAFTA Award for Best Foreign Actor for his debut performance in Jacques Becker’s The Hole (1960), and for a Primetime Emmy Award for Outstanding Lead Actor in a Limited Series or Movie for playing the titular role in the Italian miniseries The Life of Leonardo da Vinci (1971). He was previously a decorated paratrooper in the French Foreign Legion, where he served in the First Indochina War and the Algerian War.

Early life
Philippe Leroy-Beaulieu was born in Paris on 15 October 1930 to a prominent family. His ancestors included economist Pierre Paul Leroy-Beaulieu, historian Henri Jean Baptiste Anatole Leroy-Beaulieu, and architect Jean-François Leroy. He worked on an ocean liner as a teenager, and spent a year abroad in New York City.

Military service 
In 1953, he enlisted in the French Foreign Legion and served as a paratrooper in the 2nd Foreign Parachute Regiment in the French Indochina War. He later became a reservist, and served in the Algerian War as a 2nd Lieutenant. He was awarded two decorations of the Chevalier of the Légion d'honneur, a Croix de guerre des théâtres d'opérations extérieures, and the Cross for Military Valour for his service. He retired as a captain.

Acting career

Leroy made his film debut in 1960 as a character based on José Giovanni in Jacques Becker’s prison drama The Hole. Becker cast all non-professional actors as his leads to lend a sense of authenticity, Leroy among them. His performance won international recognition, and he was nominated for a BAFTA Award for Best Foreign Actor.

In 1962 he went to Italy and he started working in many Italian films and TV fictions, such as Renato Castellani's The Life of Leonardo da Vinci. He also played the role of Yanez de Gomera, Sandokan's partner, in 1976 TV series Sandokan.

During his career, he has worked with directors like Jean-Luc Godard, Jacques Deray, Dario Argento, Luc Besson, Alberto Lattuada, Luigi Magni and many more.

Personal life
Leroy married Italian journalist Silvia Tortora in 1990. They were married until her death on 10 January 2022. They had two children; Philippe and Michelle. He also has another child, actress Philippine Leroy-Beaulieu, from a previous marriage.

Leroy has continued parachuting as a hobby. He is a member of the parachuting division of the SS Lazio sports club, as well as a supporter of the Lazio's football team. In 2010 during the Rome Parashow, he celebrated his 80th birthday with a jump. In April 2011 (at the age of 81) he spent 12 days in Afghanistan with Italian paratroopers as a special correspondent.

Filmography

 Le Trou (1960) .... Manu Borelli
 Chaque minute compte (1960) .... Patrick
 Spotlight on a Murderer (1961) .... André
 Les filles sèment le vent (1961) .... Armand
 The Italian Brigands (1961) .... O Zelluso
 Leoni al sole (1961) .... Mimí
 Caccia all'uomo (1961) .... Mazzarò
 Careless (1962) .... Stefano Balli
 La loi des hommes (1962) .... Dandieu
 Alone Against Rome (1962) .... Silla
 The Shortest Day (1962) .... Soldato
 L'attico (1963) .... Tommaso
 55 Days at Peking (1963) .... Julliard
 Le Quatrième Sexe (1963) .... Paul
 The Terrorist (1963) .... Rodolfo Boscovich
 Shivers in Summer (1964) .... Manolo
 Il treno del sabato (1964) .... Paolo Traversi
 Love in Four Dimensions (1964) .... Franco Lampredi, il marito (segment "Amore e arte")
 White Voices (1964) .... Don Ascanio
 Weeping for a Bandit (1964) .... Pedro Sánchez
 Castle of the Living Dead (1964) .... Eric
 A Married Woman (1964) .... Pierre, the husband
 Amore facile (1964) .... Giovanni Bollati (segment "Il vedovo bianco")
 Love and Marriage (1964) .... (segment "Sabato 18 luglio")
 Una storia di notte (1964) .... Jimmy
 The Naked Hours (1964) .... Massimo
 The Possessed (1965) .... Mario
 Seven Golden Men (1965) .... Albert (le professeur)
 The Mandrake (1965) .... Callimaco
 Seven Golden Men Strike Again (1965) .... Albert
 A Maiden for a Prince (1966) .... Ippolito
 The Almost Perfect Crime (1966) .... Paolo Respighi
 Yankee (1966) .... Yankee
 Che notte ragazzi! (1966) .... Tony
 Lo scandalo (1966) .... David
 Non faccio la guerra, faccio l'amore (1966) .... Nicola
 The Wild Eye (1967) .... Paolo
 La notte è fatta per... rubare (1968) .... George
 The Libertine (1968) .... Tennis Instructor
 Buona Sera, Mrs. Campbell (1968) .... Vittorio
 Ecce Homo (1968) .... Jean
 Cuore di mamma (1969) .... Andrea Franti - Lorenza's ex-husband
 His Day of Glory (1969) .... The Commander
 Come, quando, perché (1969) .... Marco
 Senza sapere niente di lei (1969) .... Nanni Brà
 The Laughing Woman (1969) .... Dr. Sayer
 Mr. Superinvisible (1970)
 Senza via d'uscita (1970) .... Gilbert
 Cross Current (1971) .... Marco Breda
 Roma Bene (1971) .... Giorgio Santi
 The Life of Leonardo da Vinci (1971, TV Mini-Series) .... Leonardo da Vinci
 Stanza 17-17 palazzo delle tasse, ufficio imposte (1971) .... Romolo 'Sartana' Moretti
 Hector the Mighty (1972) .... Ettore
 Panhandle 38 (1972) .... General Briscott
 Caliber 9 (1972) .... Chino
 Naked Girl Killed in the Park (1972) .... Martin
 Gang War in Milan (1973) .... Roger Daverty
 The Black Hand (1973) .... The Professor
 R.A.S. (1973) .... Commandant Lecoq
 The Bloody Hands of the Law (1973) .... Commissario Gianni De Carmine
 Long Lasting Days (1973) .... Philippe
 Cebo para una adolescente (1974) .... Ignacio
 The Night Porter (1974) .... Klaus
 Kidnap (1974) .... The Professor
 La svergognata (1974) .... Fabio Lorenzi
 Libera, My Love (1975) .... Franco Testa
 La nuora giovane (1975) .... Franco
 Il Soldato di ventura (1976) .... Charles La Motte
 La linea del fiume (1976) .... Padre di Giacomino
 Puttana galera! (1976) .... Col. Remy
 Mannaja (1977) .... Edward M. McGowan
 Beyond Good and Evil (1977) .... Peter Gast
 The Cat (1977) .... Don Pezzolla, the priest
 La tigre è ancora viva: Sandokan alla riscossa! (1977, TV Movie) .... Yanez de Gomera
 Quella strana voglia d'amare (1977)
 Gli ultimi angeli (1978) .... Massimo
 Covert Action (1978) .... Inspector Radi Stavropoulos
 Courage - Let's Run (1979) .... Eric Sylvain de Chalamond
 Il medium (1980)
 Qua la mano (1980) .... Pope
 Tranquille donne di campagna (1980) .... Guido Maldini
 Bello di mamma (1980) .... Duca William Trinacria
 Peccato originale (1981)
 Il tango della gelosia (1981) .... Principe Giulio Lovanelli
 Teste di  (1981) .... Comandante Bartoli
 State buoni se potete (1983) .... Ignazio di Loyola
 Windsurf - Il vento nelle mani (1984) .... Lupo
 Quo Vadis (1985, TV Mini-Series) .... Paul of Tarsus
 The Berlin Affair (1985) .... Herbert Gessler
 Juke box (1985)
 A Man and a Woman: 20 Years Later (1986) .... Professeur Thevenin / Professor Thevenin
 La donna del traghetto (1986) .... Primo (Father of Viola)
 Incidente di percorso (1986)
 Montecarlo Gran Casinò (1987) .... Baron Duroc de Rothschild
 Umi e (1988)
 Don Bosco (1988) .... Leone XIII
 Deux (1989) .... M. Muller
 Un uomo di razza (1989) .... Giulio Romani
 Hiver 54, l'abbé Pierre (1989) .... Jacques
 La Femme Nikita (1990) .... Grossman
 The Man Inside (1990) .... Borges
 L'Autrichienne (1990) .... D'Estaing
 Il volo di Teo (1990)
 Netchaïev est de retour (1991) .... Luis Perez
 The Return of Casanova (1992) .... Emissaire
 Adelaide (1992) .... Koller
 Alibi perfetto (1992) .... Police Chief
 Berlin '39 (1993) .... Rostock
 Mario and the Magician (1994) .... Graziano
 Io e il re (1995) .... Conte
 In Love and War (1996) .... Count Sergio Caracciolo
 L'ombre du pharaon (1996)
 Cous-cous (1996) .... Isaia
 Le déménagement (1997) .... Le livreur 1
 The Fish in Love (1999) .... Autista
 The Town Is Quiet (2000) .... René (participation)
 Un giudice di rispetto (2000) .... Ing. Baldassarri
 Teste di cocco (2000) .... Himself / Yanez
 Vajont (2001) .... Giorgio dal Piaz
 Apri gli occhi e... sogna (2002)
 Joy - scherzi di gioia (2002)
 The Accidental Detective (2003) .... Mario Del Marro
 Five Moons Square (2003) .... Barista
 Le Cou de la girafe (2004) .... Maxime 
 Father of Mercy (2004, TV Movie) .... Papa Pio XII
 The Mother of Tears (2007) .... Guglielmo De Witt
 The Rage (2008) .... Nonno
 Blood of the Losers (2008) .... Umberto Dogliani
 Le Premier Cercle (2009) .... Halami
 Nient'altro che noi (2009) .... Maestro di Violino
 Vorrei averti qui (2010) .... Paccotto
 La strada di Paolo (2011) .... Lucio
 Breve storia di lunghi tradimenti (2012) .... Joseph Milton-Dumonnier
 Questione di Karma (2017) .... Ludovico Stern
 Chi salverà le rose? (2017) .... Eugenio
 Una gita a Roma (2017) .... Jean
 Hotel Gagarin (2018) .... Virgil

References

Bibliography

External links
 
 

1930 births
Living people
French male film actors
French expatriates in Italy
Male actors from Paris
20th-century French male actors
21st-century French male actors
French military personnel of the First Indochina War
French military personnel of the Algerian War
Officers of the French Foreign Legion
Paratroopers
French expatriate actors
Philippe